ELISA (ELectronic Intelligence by SAtellite) is a suite of four French military satellites launched on 17 December 2011 from Arianespace's Kourou spaceport in French Guiana.
It consists of microsatellites ELISA 1 (or ELISA W11, COSPAR ID: 2011-076A), ELISA 2 (or ELISA E12, COSPAR ID: 2011-076D), ELISA 3 (or ELISA W23, COSPAR ID: 2011-076C), and ELISA 4 (or ELISA E24, COSPAR ID: 2011-076B)

The entire ELISA suite was launched on a single Soyuz ST-A launch vehicle, along with Pléiades-1 and SSOT. 
The ELISA programme is a demonstrator meant to pave the way for a planned Signals intelligence constellation called CERES. The ELISA satellites are in a Low Earth orbit a few kilometres from each other to record radar and radio transmissions. Since 2014, they are used as a pre-operational system.

The satellites are built around the Myriade microsatellite bus.

See also 

 ESSAIM - another French military SIGINT microsatellite project
 CERES - the follow-on French space-based SIGINT program

References

External links 
 http://space.skyrocket.de/doc_sdat/elisa.htm
 https://web.archive.org/web/20161018011750/https://elisa.cnes.fr/en/web/CNES-en/5940-elisa.php
 http://www.arianespace.com/press-release/arianespace-vso2-mission-soyuz-sta-orbits-pleiades-1a-elisa-and-ssot/

Reconnaissance satellites of France
Signals intelligence satellites
Spacecraft launched in 2011
Spacecraft launched by Soyuz-2 rockets
Satellite constellations
Military equipment introduced in the 2010s